Aliqhayiya Mgijima (born ) is a South African rugby union player for the  in the Pro14, the  in the Currie Cup and the  in the Rugby Challenge. His regular position is centre.

Rugby career

2013: Schoolboy rugby

Mgijima was born in Adelaide. He moved to Fort Beaufort where he attended primary school before moving to Bloemfontein to attend HTS Louis Botha. In 2013, he was included in the Free State squad that competed at the premier high school rugby union competition, the Under-18 Craven Week held in Polokwane, where he started all three matches in the inside centre position.

2014–2016: Youth and Varsity Cup rugby

In 2014, he was included in the  squad that participated in the Under-19 Provincial Championship, making three appearances as a replacement in the competition.

He started the 2015 season by featuring in the Varsity Cup for Bloemfontein-based university side . In the second half of the year, he made five appearances – which included one start – for the s in the Under-21 Provincial Championship.

He made six appearances for CUT Ixias in the 2016 Varsity Cup and was named in the  squad for the 2016 Currie Cup qualification series. He was a key member of the Free State U21s' 2016 Under-21 Provincial Championship campaign, featuring in all seven of their matches. He scored one try for the team, scoring their first try of the season in a 43–26 victory over the s as the team finished in fourth place on the log to qualify for the semi-finals.

2017: Super Rugby

References

South African rugby union players
Living people
1995 births
People from Raymond Mhlaba Local Municipality
Rugby union centres
Cheetahs (rugby union) players
Free State Cheetahs players
Pumas (Currie Cup) players
Rugby union players from the Eastern Cape